
This is a list of castles from around the world.

By country

Africa 

 Castles in Ghana

 Castles in South Africa

Americas 

 Castles in Brazil
 Castles in Canada

 Castles in Mexico

 Castles in the United States

Asia 

 Castles in China

 Castles in India

 Castles in Iran

 Castles in Japan

 Castles in Lebanon

 Castles in Pakistan

 Castles in Saudi Arabia
 Castles in Sri Lanka
 Castles in Syria

Europe 
 Castles in Albania

 Castles in Armenia
 Castles in Austria
 Castles in Azerbaijan
 Castles in Belarus
 Castles in Belgium
 Castles in Bosnia and Herzegovina
 Castles in Bulgaria
 Castles in Croatia
 Castles in Cyprus
 Castles in the Czech Republic
 Castles in Denmark
 Castles in Estonia
 Castles in Finland
 Castles in France

 Castles in Germany
 Castles in Greece
 Castles in Hungary

 Castles in Ireland
 Castles in Italy
 Castles in Latvia
 Castles in Liechtenstein
 Castles in Lithuania
 Castles in Luxembourg

 Castles in Malta

 Castles in the Netherlands
 Castles in North Macedonia
 Castles in Norway
 Castles in Poland
 Castles in Portugal
 Castles in Romania
 Castles in Russia

 Castles in Serbia
 Castles in Slovakia
 Castles in Slovenia
 Castles in Spain
 Castles in Sweden
 Castles in Switzerland
 Castles in Turkey
 Castles in Ukraine
 Castles in the United Kingdom

By Continent 
 List of castles in Africa
 List of castles in Europe
 Lists of castles in North America

By type 
 List of Crusader castles
 List of motte-and-bailey castles
 List of Ismaili castles

In Fiction 
 List of fictional castles

See also 

 Castle
 Citadel
 Fortification / List of fortifications
 Palace / List of palaces
 List of buildings
 List of forts

References

External links 
 Map of Castles and Fortifications of Croatia